Gouri Devi Institute of Medical Sciences and Hospital, established in 2016, is a private medical college located in Durgapur, West Bengal. This college offers the Bachelor of Medicine and Surgery (MBBS) courses and has an annual intake capacity of 150 (50 State Government Seats & 100 Private Management seats) .This college is affiliated with the West Bengal University of Health Sciences and recognized by the National Medical Commission.

See also

References

Medical colleges in West Bengal
Affiliates of West Bengal University of Health Sciences
2016 establishments in West Bengal